Brná, also known as Brná nad Labem to distinguish from other places with the same name, is an administrative part and residential area in Ústí nad Labem, Czech Republic. It is located in landscape park České Středohoří on the right side of river Elbe. It is about 4 km far from Ústí nad Labem and its area is about 4.23 km². It's bounded on the north side by nature reserve Sluneční stráň and hill Vysoký Ostrý, on the south side by Němčický stream, on the west side by river Labe. The east border is not so distinct.

Among border points there are hills Kamenný vrch, Skřivánčí vrch and Modřín. There is Průčelský stream in Brná nad Labem and elevation is between 170 and 700 meters above sea level.

References

Populated places in Ústí nad Labem District
Ústí nad Labem
Neighbourhoods in the Czech Republic